The Battle of Namdaemun (남대문 전투), also known as the Battle of the South Great Gate, was an insurgency by the Korean army against Japanese forces in Korea as a reaction to the disbandment of the Korean army following the Japan–Korea Treaty of 1907. It took place at the Namdaemun Gate in Seoul on August 1, 1907.

Overview 

In July 1907, the Empire of Japan forced the Yunghui Emperor to disband the military of the Korean Empire. As a result, the Korean military personnel went on an armed revolution. 

The site and street where the battle exploded correspond today to the current location of the Korean Chamber of Commerce and Industry.

Because of the vastly inferior armaments of the Korean army, the battle ended in a Japanese victory, with Japan capturing the army base. Many members of the disbanded army joined Righteous Armies, and together they solidified a foundation for the Righteous Armies’ Battle of 1907.

Historical context and description 

In 1906, the 44th year of Gojong’s reign, Ito Hirobumi was installed as the first Japanese Resident-General of Korea. As Imperial Japan hurried to annex Korea outright, Gojong attempted to appeal to world leaders by sending a secret delegation to the Hague Convention of 1907. The Japanese soon discovered Gojong's plan and forced him to abdicate in July 1907, then forced his successor Sunjong to sign the Jeongmi Treaty of 1907. The treaty disbanded the Armed Forces of the Korean Empire, which was the last remaining military force of the Korean Empire.

On August 1 at 8:00 a.m., the 1st Battalion (unarmed 1st Siwi Regiment) was about to depart for the training center where the disbandment ceremony was to take place. The 1st Battalion Commander Major Park Seung-hwan (1869-1907), wrote a note on a paper in protest against the disbandment of the armed forces,

Then Park committed suicide by shooting himself. His suicide enraged the soldiers, who extorted ammunition and armaments, arranged sentries around the barracks, and started to open fire with guns against the Japanese army. The 2nd Infantry Regiment or 1st Battalion inside Sungnyemun Gate, heard the gunshots around Seosomun Gate. They arrived and also opened fire on the Imperial Japanese Army. Around 9:30 am, the Imperial Japanese Army had its 51st Infantry Regiment's first, second, and third battalions fire indiscriminately with machine guns installed on the rampart of Sungnyemun. The Korean forces' armaments were vastly inferior to the Japanese army's. Therefore, the Namdaemun Barracks has occupied around 10:50  the Imperial Japanese Army took a.m., and the Seosomun Barracks around 11:40 a.m.

A significant part of the Imperial Korean Armed Forces kept resisting outside Seosomun Gate. Many of the disbanded soldiers joined the Righteous Armies to fight. They strengthened a foundation for the Righteous Armies’ Battle of 1907, which led to the Anti-Japanese War of the Righteous Armies. A geographical map of Gyeongseong in 1903 shows that the Barracks of the 1st Battalion (currently 120 in Seosomun-dong) and the Barracks of the 2nd Battalion (now 34 in Nanchang-dong) were located in the southeast of Seosomun Gate and Sungnyemun Gate, respectively. Seosomun and Sungnyemun are the places where the street battle exploded. This site now corresponds to the current Korea Chamber of Commerce and Industry.

Analysis 

The Battle of Namdaemun against Japan sparked the desire to resist the dissolution of the Korean army.

From an international point of view, the battle was a small combat action because of the small size of the Korean forces. Indeed, Korean soldiers numbered only 3,000 during this battle.

On the other hand, this event was necessary from a Korean national point of view because almost all of the capital guards were committed to it. There were 20,000 Korean soldiers in the country and only 4,000 in the capital city.

Aftermath 

Many members of the Korean Empire Armies were killed or captured during the Battle of Namdaemun.

The Righteous Army 
Before the Battle of Namdaemun, the Righteous Army was mainly composed of poor peasants, fishers, tiger hunters, miners, merchants, and laborers. After the Battle of Namdaemun, many regular army members joined the Righteous Army in 1907.

Cultural references

 Mr. Sunshine (2018 Korean drama)

See also 

 Hague Secret Emissary Affair
 Itō Hirobumi
 Ye Wanyong
 Sunjong of Korea
 Japan–Korea Treaty of 1907
 Unequal treaty
 Righteous army
 Korean independence movement

Notes

References 

1907 in Korea
Military history of Korea
Korea under Japanese rule
Namdaemun
Namdaemun
Namdaemun